Shambuka (IAST: śambūka) is an interpolated character, which is not found in the original Valmiki Ramayana but in the later addition called "Uttara Kanda". According to the story, Shambuka, a shudra ascetic, was killed by Rama for attempting to perform tapas in violation of dharma, resulting in the bad karma   which caused the death of a Brahmin's son.

This story was created at a later period.

Story
According to this story, when Rama was ruling Ayodhya, a Brahmin approached the court and told everyone that his young son has died due to the misrule of Rama. Rama immediately called a meeting with all his ministers and enquired about the cause of this. The sage Narada told him that this has happened due to a violation of a rule of tapas (austerities). Narada informed him that a shudra was performing tapas, which was prohibited in the age of Treta. So Rama went in search of the shudra and found the place where Shambuka was performing penance. After confirming that Shambuka is indeed a shudra, Rama killed him. The gods praised Rama for this act and congratulated him for protecting their interests and for not allowing shudra to attain heaven in person. Brahmin's son was also resurrected.

Reception 
Authors such as Rabindranath Tagore, Mahatma Gandhi treat the character of Shambukha as an interpolation and creation of a later period. The Pushtimarg Vaishnavite tradition points out that the Ramayana refers to other shudras, such as Shabari, who lived in the forest. Shambuka therefore deliberately violated dharma in order to get Rama's attention, and attained salvation when he was beheaded. The celebrated Kannada poet Kuvempu, in his play Shudra Tapasvi shows Rama as having to both carry out his duty by punishing Shambuka, and simultaneously protect Shambuka, as a pious and devout sage, from persecution, and thereby turns the story into a critique of Brahminical attitudes and a defense of Rama.

In his seminal work Annihilation of Caste, B. R. Ambedkar points out the story of Shambuka while criticizing the varna system. He argues that not only it is impossible to accurately classify people into four definite classes but that the varna system faces the problem of the transgressor. He further explains that unless the transgressor is punished, men will not keep to their respective classes i.e. the whole system will collapse. In the Ramayana, according to Ambedkar, Rama ensured that transgression did not happen in his kingdom by killing Shambuka.

K.R. Raju termed the story of Shambuka as "frivolous" and "maliciously fabricated". Scholar N. M. Chakravarthy, treats "Uttara Kanda" to be an interpolation and finds the story of Shambuka to be "wholly untenable".

Notes

Characters in the Ramayana
Hinduism-related controversies